Late Night America, formerly PBS LateNight is PBS's first nationally broadcast talk and viewer phone-in television program, hosted by Dennis Wholey.  It premiered January 4, 1982.

References

1982 American television series debuts
1980s American television talk shows
American late-night television shows
PBS original programming